As a songwriter, Josh Skinners work has appeared on several international projects. He co-wrote an album with Swedish pop star Sara Lumholdt (A-teens) and several English/Spanish songs for actress/singer Alessandra Rosaldo ("Instructions Not Included"). “Por Tu Amor” and “Eres” were used in Rosaldo’s international hit telenovela "Ni contigo ni sin ti" (115 episodes) and as the theme of her televised wedding to Spanish actor Eugenio Derbez in Mexico City (July 2012). Skinner co-wrote Kimberley Locke's "Sirens" with Locke and Producer Russell Ali. He also co-wrote Locke's "Endless Possibilities," which debuted at the 2013 Writers & Illustrators of the Future Awards. Skinner spent 9 weeks on the Billboard charts with Sir Ivan‘s dance hit, “La La Land.” The song also reached #10 on the UK Music Week’s Upfront Club Chart and Top 20 on the DJ Times National Crossover Pool Chart.

Skinner debuted "Living Off the Page" and "Off the Ground" at the Writers & Illustrators of the Future Awards at the historic Wilshire Ebell Theater in Los Angeles (April 2014). Drew Seeley performed "Living Off the Page" with Cassie Simone.  "Off the Ground" was performed solo by Seeley.

Skinner has a project with Dave Koz and there's speculation that Hollywood Records will release a song he co-wrote with producer Brandon Slavinski for Disney Channel star Ross Lynch (Austin and Ally).  Lynch's brothers, Rocky Lynch and Riker Lynch of R5 have also tweeted about working with Skinner and Slavinski.

Withjosh.com is an internet series where Skinner interviews various people who've made their mark in pop culture. Some interviews include Kris Jenner, Sherri Shepherd, American Idol Winner Kris Allen, Lt. Dan Choi, CNN's Don Lemon and the final interview with the late Eleanor Mondale.

In Fall of 2012, Skinner hosted the daytime talk show “Good Morning 90210″ with Raylene Bartolacci on the FilmOn Network.

Other television appearances include "Live Like a Star" and "On-Air with Ryan Seacrest" (Fox). He produced and costarred in the short film "Rules of the Game" with Oscar nominee Bruce Davison, and played a supporting role in the feature film "Confession" starring Chris Pine.

Skinner is also an ordained minister and performed his first wedding on the Style Network's "Weddings Altered."  In April 2013, Skinner officiated the wedding of  Drew Seeley and Amy Paffrath in Key West, Florida.  He also officiated the wedding of music producer Russell Ali and Emma Bing, the inspiration for the pregnancy bible "What to Expect When You're Expecting."

Filmography
 Good Morning 90210 "co-host" (15 episodes, 2012)
 Cinemania (1 episode, "The Day the Earth Stood Still", 2008) played "Contestant/self"
 Confession (2005) played "Ricky"
 Knock First (1 episode, "Celebrity Edition: Kimberley Locke", 2005) played "Himself"
 Live Like a Star (1 episode, "Idol-ization", 2004) played "Himself" (1 episode, 2004)
 Rules of the Game (2003) played "Wayne/Clerk" (also credited as associate producer)
 Stuck (2003) played "Shakespeare teacher"
 The Color of War (1 episode, "Price of War", 2001) played "Carl Peterson"
 Who Knows the Band? (1 episode, 2001) played "Lance Bass' Friend"
 Fantasy Island (1 episode, "Secret Self", 1998) played "Talk Show Troubled Teen"
 The Byrds of Paradise  (1 episode, "This Band Is My Band", 1994) played "Franny's Friend"

Music
2008: "First" - Sara Lumholdt (co-writer) 
2008: "Mr. Right Now" - Sara Lumholdt (co-writer) 
2008: "Kiss Me Goodbye" - Sara Lumholdt (co-writer) 
2008: "Where Does the Love Go" - Sara Lumholdt (co-writer) 
2008: "OMG" - Sara Lumholdt (co-writer) 
2008: "Another Song About You" - Sara Lumholdt (co-writer) 
2008: "Back to You" - Sara Lumholdt (co-writer) 
2008: "Baby, Throw it Down" - Sara Lumholdt (co-writer) 
2008: "Not Even a Man" - Sara Lumholdt (co-writer) 
2008: "Grasp" - Sara Lumholdt (co-writer) 
2008: "Addicting Love" - Sara Lumholdt (co-writer) 
2009: "Learn to Love" - Eddie Kaulukukui (co-writer) 
2009: "Journey of a Broken Heart" - Eddie Kaulukukui (co-writer) 
2009: "One Voice" - Eddie Kaulukukui (co-writer)
2009: "Fallen Angel" - Eddie Kaulukukui (co-writer)
2009: "Coming Home" - Eddie Kaulukukui (co-writer)
2010: "Breathless" - Alessandra Rosaldo (co-writer)
2010: "Eres" - Alessandra Rosaldo (co-writer) 
2010: "Did You Lie" - Alessandra Rosaldo (co-writer)
2010: "No Diga Mas" - Alessandra Rosaldo (co-writer)
2010: "You Told Me" - Alessandra Rosaldo (co-writer)
2010: "Good Morning, Goodbye" - Alessandra Rosaldo (co-writer)
2010: "Holding On" - Alessandra Rosaldo (co-writer)
2010: "Por tu Amor" - Alessandra Rosaldo (co-writer)
2011: "Sirens (featuring Sev Sanders)" - Kimberley Locke (co-writer)
2011: "Sirens" (radio edit) - Kimberley Locke (co-writer)
2012: "La La Land" - Sir Ivan (co-writer)
2013: "Endless Possibilities" - Kimberley Locke (co-writer)
2014: "Living Off the Page" - performed by Drew Seeley and Cassie Simone
2014: "Off the Ground" - performed by Drew Seeley

References

External links
 Official site
 Official Twitter
 

Living people
Male actors from Los Angeles
Place of birth missing (living people)
Year of birth missing (living people)
Songwriters from California